

474001–474100 

|-bgcolor=#f2f2f2
| colspan=4 align=center | 
|}

474101–474200 

|-bgcolor=#f2f2f2
| colspan=4 align=center | 
|}

474201–474300 

|-bgcolor=#f2f2f2
| colspan=4 align=center | 
|}

474301–474400 

|-bgcolor=#f2f2f2
| colspan=4 align=center | 
|}

474401–474500 

|-id=440
| 474440 Nemesnagyágnes ||  || Ágnes Nemes Nagy (1922–1991) was a Hungarian poet, writer, educator, and translator. She is generally considered to be Hungary's most important woman poet of the 20th century. In 1946 she published her first volume of poetry, but during the 1950s, her own work was suppressed and she worked as a translator. || 
|}

474501–474600 

|-bgcolor=#f2f2f2
| colspan=4 align=center | 
|}

474601–474700 

|-id=640
| 474640 Alicanto ||  || The Alicanto is a Chilean mythological bird of the Atacama Desert whose wings shine at night with beautiful, metallic colors. A miner who follows it can find rich mineral outcrops or treasures, but if the Alicanto discovers that it's being followed, it will turn off the shining of its wings and scuttle away in the darkness of the night. || 
|}

474701–474800 

|-bgcolor=#f2f2f2
| colspan=4 align=center | 
|}

474801–474900 

|-bgcolor=#f2f2f2
| colspan=4 align=center | 
|}

474901–475000 

|-bgcolor=#f2f2f2
| colspan=4 align=center | 
|}

References 

474001-475000